Dougal Drysdale (born in Scotland, UK) is a Professor Emeritus in Fire Safety Engineering at the University of Edinburgh and member of the BRE Centre for Fire Safety Engineering.

Drysdale is one of the leading international authorities in Fire Safety Engineering and is the author of the standard reference text in the field, "An Introduction to Fire Dynamics". He has been involved in teaching and research in the general area of fire dynamics and has published over 100 papers.

His wide range of research interests include the ignition characteristics of combustible materials and their fire growth characteristics, smoke production in fires, fire spread and fire dynamics, problems of non-linear dynamics with reference to fire modelling, the application of CFD to modelling flame spread, fire suppression and extinction and the response of steel-framed structures to fire exposure.

Drysdale is a member of the editorial board for the Third Edition of the SFPE Handbook of Fire Protection Engineering. He was Vice-Chairman of The International Association for Fire Safety Science from 1994–2002 and its Chairman from 2002 - 2005. He is currently the Editor of Fire Safety Journal. He is also fellow of the Royal Society of Edinburgh, the Institution of Fire Engineers as well as the Society of Fire Protection Engineers.

In recognition of his expertise, Drysdale is the recipient of numerous awards including "Man of the Year" (1983) and the Arthur B. Guise Medal (1995) by the Society of Fire Protection Engineers, the Kawagoe Medal of The International Association for Fire Safety Science (2002), the Rasbash Medal by the IFE/ECD in 2005, and the Peter Lund award (2009) from by the Society of Fire Protection Engineers.

He has been involved in a number of Public Inquiries, including the King's Cross Underground Station fire (London 1987), the Piper Alpha explosion and fire (North Sea, July 1988) and the fire in the Garley Building (Hong Kong, 1996). He is a member of the Independent Board of Investigation into the Buncefield Explosion (December 2005).

References

External links 
 University of Edinburgh's Fire Safety Engineering webpage
 Short lecture on Fire Safety by Prof. Drysdale
 The Buncefield Investigation Official government enquiry.

Living people
Academics of the University of Edinburgh
Year of birth missing (living people)